This is a partial list of forts in Nepal.

Forts

References

External links 

 Fort (Gadhi) Gallery

Nepal
Forts
Forts
Forts